The 2007 PBA All-Star Weekend was the annual all-star weekend of the Philippine Basketball Association (PBA)'s 2006–07 PBA season. The events were held at the Pacoy Ortega Gym, San Fernando City, La Union and at the University of Baguio Gym, Baguio.

Thursday events

Obstacle Challenge
Time in seconds.

Shooting Stars Challenge
Jayjay Helterbrand, Dominic Uy and San Fernando City councilor Panding Nince def. Mick Pennisi, Richard del Rosario and councilor Pablo Ortega.

Trick Shot Challenge
Dennis Miranda def. Ranidel de Ocampo and Ronald Tubid.

Three-point shootout

Hontiveros, Miller and David qualified for the Legends Shootout.

Slam Dunk competition

Failed to qualify: Kelly Williams, Gabby Espinas, Aaron Aban, Ronald Tubid

Rookie-Sophomore Blitz Game

In the game, there were four 10-minute quarters, the 8-second rule was lessened into 6 seconds, the shot clock was cut into 18 seconds, and a slam dunk counted for three points.

Sunday events

Legends Shootout

All-Star Game

Rosters

North All-Stars:
Rommel Adducul (San Miguel)
John Arigo (Coca-Cola)
Mark Cardona (Talk 'N Text)
Mark Caguioa (Barangay Ginebra)
Gary David (Air21)
Ranidel de Ocampo (Air21)
Larry Fonacier (Red Bull)
Danny Ildefonso (San Miguel)
Jayjay Helterbrand (Barangay Ginebra)
Kerby Raymundo (Purefoods)
Enrico Villanueva (Red Bull)
Willie Miller (Alaska)
Coach: Jong Uichico (Barangay Ginebra)

South All-Stars:
Jimmy Alapag (Talk 'N Text)
Cyrus Baguio (Red Bull)
Tony dela Cruz (Alaska)
Dondon Hontiveros (San Miguel)
Sunday Salvacion (Barangay Ginebra)
Danny Seigle (San Miguel)
Asi Taulava (Talk 'N Text)
Sonny Thoss (Alaska)
Ronald Tubid (Barangay Ginebra)
Kelly Williams (Sta. Lucia)
Roger Yap (Purefoods)
James Yap (Purefoods)
Coach: Tim Cone (Alaska)

Game

The All Star Game started with a crazy dance by the South All-Stars. The addition of the three point dunk added to the output of the highest scoring (half-time) in PBA all-star history. The South led by as much as 20 points in the game only to be defeated by the North All-Stars, the trend wherein the host always win has not yet been broken.

References
Thursday events

All-Star Weekend
Philippine Basketball Association All-Star Weekend
Sports in Benguet
Sports in La Union